Ronald Read may refer to:

 Ronald C. Read (1924–2019), British mathematician
 Ronald Kingsley Read (1887–1975), creator of a writing system
 Ronald Read (philanthropist) (1921–2014), American philanthropist

See also
 Ron Reed (born 1942), basketball and baseball player